Mobile Web Ghana is a technology hub and a co-working space in Accra, Ghana that empowers entrepreneurs and the youth through mobile and web technology training. It was started in October 2010, as part of the World Wide Web Foundation ‘Mobile Entrepreneurship Ghana’ program. Mobile Web Ghana was among the tech hubs represented at Impact Hub Accra during the visit of French President Emmanuel Macron and Dutch Prime Minister Mark Rutte. MWG and iSpace Foundation led the Unlocking Women and Technology (UWAT) to equip women and ladies technology and entrepreneurial skills in Accra.

See also 
 iSpace Foundation
 Impact Hub Accra

References 

Community centres